Washington Township is a township in Lucas County, Iowa, USA.

History
Washington Township was established in 1852.

References

Townships in Lucas County, Iowa
Townships in Iowa